The Christ the King Cathedral is a religious building in the Catholic Church that serves as the cathedral of Aba, a city with more than 500,000 inhabitants in Abia State in of Nigeria. The church is the seat of the Bishop of the Diocese of Aba in Nigeria. The first small church of Christ the King in Aba was built by Eugene Groetz in 1929. Before his death in 1948, however, Groetz recognized the need to build a larger church and it sent Akpo Jacob to Italy to study the European Churches.

In 1963 the nave was completed, and in subsequent years various improvements followed. In 1993 a hexagonal baptistery in the nave to the east was added, the sacristy was expanded in 2002, and the exterior was improved with gardens, trees and statues of St. Peter and St. Paul in the west and east of St. Ann. In December 2004, the cathedral was dedicated to Christ the King.

See also
Roman Catholicism in Nigeria
Christ the King Cathedral (disambiguation)

References

Roman Catholic cathedrals in Nigeria
Buildings and structures in Aba, Abia
Roman Catholic churches completed in 1929
20th-century Roman Catholic church buildings in Nigeria